The Rajasthan High Court is the High Court of the state of Rajasthan. It was established on 29 August 1949 under the Rajasthan High Court Ordinance, 1949.

The seat of the court is at Jodhpur. The court has a sanctioned judge strength of 50. 

There were five High Courts functioning in the various units of the States - at Jodhpur, Jaipur and Bikaner, the High Courts of former Rajasthan and Matsya Union, before unification of the Rajasthan.  The Rajasthan High Court Ordinance, 1949 abolished these different jurisdictions and provided for a single High Court for the entire State. The High Court of Rajasthan was founded in 1949 at Jaipur, and was inaugurated by the Rajpramukh, Maharaja Sawai Man Singh on 29 August 1949, later on after complete integration of Rajasthan in 1956 it was moved at Jodhpur with recommendation of the Satyanarayan Rao committee.

The first Chief Justice was Kamala Kant Verma. A bench was formed at Jaipur on 31 January 1977 under sub-section (2) of Section 51 of the States Reorganisation Act, 1956 which was dissolved in 1958. Currently the sanctioned strength of the judges is 50 and actual strength is 34.

The highcourt was shifted to a new premises on outskirts of Jodhpur from the city centre in 2019. The president of India inaugurated the newly constructed building

List of chief justices

Rajasthan High Court Bar Association, Jaipur

Rajasthan High Court Bar Association, Jaipur is a registered society of the Advocates practicing at Jaipur Bench of  Rajasthan High Court. The body elects its office bearers through direct election every year.

Statue of Manu
On March 3, 1989, the Rajasthan Judicial Officers Association sponsored by the Lions Club had installed a Manu idol in front of the lawn of the high court with the permission of the high court.

See also
High courts of India
List of chief justices of the Rajasthan High Court
List of judges of the Rajasthan High Court

References

 Jurisdiction and Seats of Indian High Courts
 Judge strength in High Courts increased

External links
 Rajasthan High Court official website
 List of Former Chief Justices of Rajasthan High Court
 List of Former Justices of Rajasthan High Court

Government of Rajasthan
1949 establishments in Rajasthan
Courts and tribunals established in 1949